Haloarculaceae is a family of halophilic and mostly chemoorganotrophic archaea within the order Halobacteriales.  The type genus of this family is Haloarcula. Its biochemical characteristics are the same as the order Halobacteriales.

The name Haloarculaceae is derived from the Latin term Haloarcula, referring to the type genus of the family and the suffix "-ceae," an ending used to denote a family. Together, Haloarculaceae refers to a family whose nomenclatural type is the genus Haloarcula.

Current Taxonomy and Molecular Signatures 
As of 2021, Haloarculaceae contains 10 validly published genera. This family can be molecularly distinguished from other Halobacteria by the presence of 19 conserved signature proteins (CSPs) and seven conserved signature indels (CSIs) present in the following proteins: acetylglutamate kinase, ribonuclease R, metallo-beta-lactamase, tRNA modifying enzyme, carbamoyl phosphate synthase large subunit and hypothetical proteins.

Phylogeny
The currently accepted taxonomy is based on the List of Prokaryotic names with Standing in Nomenclature (LPSN) and National Center for Biotechnology Information (NCBI).

Note: * paraphyletic Halobacteriaceae

See also 
 List of Archaea genera

References 

Halobacteria